The Arabian Peninsula coastal fog desert, also known as the Southwestern Arabian coastal xeric scrub, is desert ecoregion on the southern coasts of the Arabian Peninsula, which experiences thick fogs where visibility may be reduced to . It is classed as an Afrotropical fog desert

Location and description
This ecosystem exists on a strip along the western and eastern coasts of Arabia. In Oman and Yemen moisture is provided by thick fogs coming off the ocean during the summer khareef monsoon, while the hot Tihamah plain is moisturised by some rainfall and the generally high humidity of the Red Sea.

Flora
In this region, although it rarely rains the fog provides moisture sufficient to nurture a great deal of grassland, shrubs and thick woodland. There are over sixty local species of plant. This coastal strip is of particular importance as further inland where the fog does not have an influence most of the Arabian Peninsula is desert. Vegetation varies progressively away from the coast which features dense woodland of Anogeissus dhofarica, Senegalia senegal and various thorny Commiphora trees and shrubs. The richest flora can be found in the Dhofar mountains which have 900 plants including 60 endemic species and two endemic genera, Cibirhiza and Dhofaria. One of these plants, Boswellia sacra (frankincense), was a source of great wealth for Dhofar in antiquity. In Yemen, the side of Jabal Urays facing the sea is covered with Euphorbia balsamifera shrubs.

Fauna
The many mammals found here include the Arabian Oryx (Oryx leucoryx) which was reintroduced to the wild after disappearing, Arabian Gazelle and Nubian Ibex, a goat antelope. Predators found on the coast include Caracal,  Arabian Wolf, Striped Hyena and the critically endangered Arabian Leopard (Panthera pardus nimr), which survives on Jebel Samhan in the Dhofar mountains.

Threats and preservation
The main threat to this ecosystem is overgrazing by increasing numbers of cattle and other livestock as well as off-road driving and human encroachment. Urban areas in this ecoregion include: in Oman the port of Duqm and the Dhofar capital of Salalah; in Yemen, the Hadhramaut port capital Mukalla, the former capital and ancient port of Aden, the Red Sea coffee ports of Al Hudaydah (still the largest town on this coast of Yemen) and Mocha, and the World Heritage Site of Zabid; and the city of Jizan, the fruit basket of Saudi Arabia. Protected areas in Oman include the controversial Arabian Oryx Sanctuary where the reintroduction took place, and Jabal Samhan Nature Reserve established for the protection of the leopards. There are a number of Important Bird Areas on the coast of Yemen but none are officially protected.

References

External links

Google books
Britannica Arabian Desert

Ecoregions of Asia
Deserts and xeric shrublands
Ecoregions of Oman
Ecoregions of Saudi Arabia
Ecoregions of Yemen
Arabian Peninsula
Deserts of Oman
Deserts of Saudi Arabia
Deserts of Yemen
Afrotropical ecoregions